John Thompson Gulager (born December 19, 1957) is an American actor, cinematographer and film director.

Biography

Film career
The production and filming of Feast was the main focus of season three of Project Greenlight. The film, made for Miramax, had a limited theatrical release. The DVD version of Feast was released on October 17, 2006.  Gulager was named Best Director at Fantastic Fest 2005 for Feast.

Gulager played Maurice Gregory, the company psychologist, and supplied the voice for Goldie, the fish, in the 2007 film He Was a Quiet Man opposite Christian Slater.

Music

Transistors  (1978) Songwriter/Vocalist/Keyboardist - Founder with Gary Miller

Forbidden Colors (1980) Keyboardist/Vocalist

Personal life
He is the son of actors Clu Gulager and Miriam Byrd-Nethery, and the brother of actor Tom Gulager.

Filmography

As actor
 A Day with the Boys (1969) – Boy
 Gunfighter – Rustler
 a.k.a. Ballad of a Gunfighter (USA: TV title) (1998)
 Palmer's Pick Up (1999) – Santa Claus
 The Poet Writes His Wife (2002) – Dylan Thomas
 Feast (2005) - Man on television with two other crew members
 He Was a Quiet Man (2007) – Maurice Goldie (voice)
 Pulse 2: Afterlife (2008) – Man on Bridge
 Hellraiser: Judgment (2018) - The Assessor

As cinematographer
 The Poet Writes His Wife (2002)
 Vic (2005)
 Pornstar Pets (2005) (Video)
 La Lucha: The Struggle (2005) (Video)

As director
 Feast (2005)
 Feast II: Sloppy Seconds (2008)
 Feast III: The Happy Finish (2009)
 Piranha 3DD (2012)
 Zombie Night (2013)
 Children of the Corn: Runaway (2018)

Other TV appearances
 Project Greenlight 3 (2005) (TV Series) Himself
 New Wave Theatre (1980) Forbidden Colors

References

External links

American male film actors
American cinematographers
Film directors from New York City
Horror film directors
1957 births
Living people
20th-century American male actors
21st-century American male actors
Male actors from New York City